Benjamin Roberts was a British colonial governor. He was Deputy Governor of Anguilla from 1768 until 1771.

References

Deputy Governors of Anguilla
18th-century British people
Year of birth missing
Year of death missing